These Football Times is a leading independent association football magazine and online publication that emphasizes long-form journalism. Each bi-monthly print issue aims to focus on a specific area of the sport or an individual club, with These Football Times often working directly with the clubs on production. As part of the Guardian Sport Network, These Football Times publishes feature articles regularly on TheGuardian.com as well. Andrew Flint, a senior writer for These Football Times, was named Football Supporters' Federation Writer of the Year in 2016, while many others have received the nomination, as well as for other awards across the football spectrum.

References

Association football magazines
Bi-monthly magazines published in the United Kingdom

English-language magazines
Magazines established in 2011
Online magazines published in the United Kingdom
Sports magazines published in the United Kingdom